The Horwitz Defense (ECO code A40) is a chess opening defined by the moves:

1. d4 e6

This response to White's Queen's Pawn Game, is named for the German chess master and writer Bernhard Horwitz (1807–85), who is known to have played it 
four times against fellow German master Daniel Harrwitz between 1849 and 1852. Players such as the English grandmaster Simon Williams often use 1.d4 e6 as a way of playing for the Dutch Defense while avoiding the Staunton Gambit (1.d4 f5 2.e4!?). 

As such the opening has little independent significance. It is likely to transpose to other openings listed below.
Dutch Defense (after 2.c4 f5 or 2.Nf3 f5)
Keres Defense (after 2.c4 Bb4+)
French Defense (after 2.e4 d5)
Queen's Gambit Declined (after 2.c4 d5)
Sicilian Defense (after 2.e4 c5 3.Nf3 cxd4)
Benoni Defense (after 2.e4 c5 3.d5). 

A famous game was played in this defense between Edward Lasker and George Thomas. The Queen was sacrificed and the King walked to the other side of the board.

See also 
 List of chess openings
 List of chess openings named after people

References

Chess openings